Mahuaa Bangla was an Indian Bengali-language general entertainment television channel launched by Mahuaa Media Private Limited, launched in 2010. It later ceased transmissions in 2012.

About the channel
Owned by Mahuaa Media Pvt. Ltd., the owners of a Bhojpuri Channel with the same name, they announced their plans of launching a Bengali Channel. On 9 July 2010, the officials of MMPL organised a press conference in Kolkata, and at the same time unveiled the logo of the channel and its programming line-up. Mahuaa Bangla ceased operations in December 2012.

Former shows
Janmantar
Duorani
Harano Sur (2010 TV series)
Vish Kanya (TV series)
Kajori (TV series)

Reality Shows
Ke Hobe Banglar Kotipoti (Season 1)
Sur – Sangram Bangla
Twinkle Twinkle Little Stars

See also
Mahuaa TV

References

External links
 Official Mahuaa Bangla website(closed now)

Television stations in Kolkata
Television channels and stations established in 2010
2010 establishments in West Bengal
Television channels and stations disestablished in 2012